The following is a list of the MTV Europe Music Award winners and nominees for Best Asia and Pacific Act.

2010's

See also 
 MTV VMA International Viewer's Choice Award for MTV Asia
 MTV VMA International Viewer's Choice Award for MTV Australia
 MTV VMA International Viewer's Choice Award for MTV China
 MTV VMA International Viewer's Choice Award for MTV Japan
 MTV VMA International Viewer's Choice Award for MTV Korea
 MTV VMA International Viewer's Choice Award for MTV Mandarin
 MTV VMA International Viewer's Choice Award for MTV Southeast Asia
 MTV Asia Awards
 MTV Australia Awards
 MTV Video Music Awards Japan
 MTV Pilipinas Music Awards

MTV Europe Music Awards
Awards established in 2011